Affection or fondness is a "disposition or state of mind or body" that is often associated with a feeling or type of love. It has given rise to a number of branches of philosophy and psychology concerning emotion, disease, influence, and state of being. "Affection" is popularly used to denote a feeling or type of love, amounting to more than goodwill or friendship. Writers on ethics generally use the word to refer to distinct states of feeling, both lasting and spasmodic. Some contrast it with passion as being free from the distinctively sensual element.

Even a very simple demonstration of affection can have a broad variety of emotional reactions, from embarrassment, to disgust, pleasure, and annoyance. It also has a different physical effect on the giver and the receiver.

Restricted definition

More specifically, the word has been restricted to emotional states, the object of which is a living thing such as a human or animal. Affection is compared with passion, from the Greek "pathos". As such, it appears in the writings of French philosopher René Descartes, Dutch philosopher Baruch Spinoza, and most of the writings of early British ethicists. However, on various grounds (e.g., that it does not involve anxiety or excitement and that it is comparatively inert and compatible with the entire absence of the gratifyingly physical element), it is generally distinguished from passion. In this narrower sense, the word has played a great part in ethical systems, which have spoken of the social or parental affections as in some sense a part of moral obligations. For a consideration of these and similar problems, which depend ultimately on the degree in which the affections are regarded as voluntary.

Expression

Affection can be communicated by looks, words, gestures, or touches. It conveys love and social connection. The five love languages explains how couples can communicate affections to each other. Affectionate behavior may have evolved from parental nurturing behavior due to its associations with hormonal rewards. Such affection has been shown to influence brain development in infants, especially their biochemical systems and prefrontal development. 
Expressions of affection can be unwelcome if they pose implied threats to one's well-being. If welcomed, affectionate behavior may be associated with various health benefits. It has been proposed that positive sentiments increase the propensity of people to interact and that familiarity gained through affection increases positive sentiments among them.

Benefits of affection
Affection exchange is seen as an adaptive human behavior that contributes to greater physical and mental well-being. The expression of affection mediates emotional, physical, and relational benefits for the individual and significant counterparts. The communication of positive feelings towards others has shown health benefits that include lower stress hormones, lower cholesterol, lower blood pressure and stronger immune system. Benefits are internally noticed when the emotion is expressed and not merely felt; if affection is not reciprocated through the receiver, effects of the affection are still felt through the giver. Therefore increasing the better system of affection for good.

Parental relationships
Affectionate behavior is often regarded as the result of parental nurturing behavior due to its associations with hormonal rewards. Positive and negative parental behaviors can be linked to later life health problems. Abuse is a common attribute to poor health in later life, as the lack of affection leads to naturally poorer well-being and mental health. A 2013 study showed the effects of early child abuse and the outcome between lack of affection and the strong biological link for how these negative early-life experiences affect physical health.

Affectionism 
Affectionism is a school of thought which considers affections as central importance. Although it is not found in mainstream Western philosophy, it does exist in Indian philosophy.

See also

 Affectional orientation
 Affective filter
 Affective videogames
 Attraction
 Crush
 Doctrine of the affections
 Emotion
 Hug
 Infatuation
 List of emotions
 Social connection
 The Four Loves
 Terms of endearment

References

External links

 
Phrenology
Emotions
Love
Personal life